Vũ Thị Trang (born 19 May 1992) is a badminton player from Vietnam. She competed at the 2016 Summer Olympics in Rio de Janeiro, Brazil. She was a bronze medallist at the 2010 Youth Olympic Games in Singapore.

In 2016, Vũ married fellow Vietnam badminton Olympian Nguyễn Tiến Minh.

Achievements

Southeast Asian Games 
Women's singles

Youth Olympic Games 
Girls' singles

BWF Grand Prix (1 runner-up) 
The BWF Grand Prix had two levels, the Grand Prix and Grand Prix Gold. It was a series of badminton tournaments sanctioned by the Badminton World Federation (BWF) and played between 2007 and 2017.

Women's singles

  BWF Grand Prix Gold tournament
  BWF Grand Prix tournament

BWF International Challenge/Series (10 titles, 3 runners-up) 
Women's singles

Women's doubles

  BWF International Challenge tournament
  BWF International Series tournament
  BWF Future Series tournament

References

External links
 
 
 
 

1992 births
Living people
People from Bắc Giang Province
Vietnamese female badminton players
21st-century Vietnamese women
Badminton players at the 2016 Summer Olympics
Olympic badminton players of Vietnam
Badminton players at the 2010 Summer Youth Olympics
Badminton players at the 2010 Asian Games
Badminton players at the 2014 Asian Games
Badminton players at the 2018 Asian Games
Asian Games competitors for Vietnam
Competitors at the 2007 Southeast Asian Games
Competitors at the 2011 Southeast Asian Games
Competitors at the 2013 Southeast Asian Games
Competitors at the 2015 Southeast Asian Games
Competitors at the 2017 Southeast Asian Games
Competitors at the 2019 Southeast Asian Games
Competitors at the 2021 Southeast Asian Games
Southeast Asian Games bronze medalists for Vietnam
Southeast Asian Games medalists in badminton